Radical Romantics is the third studio album by Fever Ray, an alias of Swedish musician Karin Dreijer. It was released on 10 March 2023 through Rabid and Mute Records. The album features contributions from producers Trent Reznor and Atticus Ross of Nine Inch Nails, and Dreijer's brother, Olof, with whom they formed half of electronic music duo the Knife. Radical Romantics was preceded by three singles: "What They Call Us", "Carbon Dioxide", and "Kandy".

Critical reception

Radical Romantics received critical acclaim from critics. At Metacritic, which assigns a normalized rating out of 100 to reviews from mainstream publications, the album received an average score of 82, based on 16 reviews.

Track listing
All lyrics written by Karin Dreijer. Vocal production is handled by Johannes Berglund on all tracks.

Notes
  indicates an additional producer

Charts

References

2023 albums
Fever Ray albums
Electropop albums
Synth-pop albums by Swedish artists